Joshua Hughes may refer to:

Josh Hughes (born 1991), American soccer player
Joshua Hughes (bishop) (1807–1889), Welsh bishop
Joshua Pritchard Hughes (1847–1938), British bishop